The James Madison Dukes women's basketball team is the basketball team that represents James Madison University in Harrisonburg, Virginia, United States. The school's team currently competes in the Sun Belt Conference after previously playing in the Colonial Athletic Association (CAA). The Dukes are led by fifth-year head coach Sean O'Regan.

The Dukes have appeared in the NCAA Division I Tournament thirteen times, most recently in 2023. Including Women's National Invitation Tournament (WNIT) berths, the Dukes have played in a post-season tournament each season since 2006.

History
James Madison's women's basketball program is among the oldest in the nation, being founded in 1920. The program's first coach, Althea Loose Johnston, coached the team to a 106-33-5 record during her 22 year career.  Through the end of the 2022–23 season, the Dukes have compiled a record of 1200-585 (.672), the fourth most wins among all Division I programs and only one of four with over 1,200 wins.

In the 1986 and 1991 NCAA women's tournaments, they upset the #1 seed (Virginia in the former and Penn State in the latter) while ranked #8 (the lowest seed at the time), being the first team to ever do that on the women's side (the size of the tournament for the former was 40 while the latter had 48 teams). They are one of only three schools to upset a #1 seed while ranked as the lowest seed (the other being Southwest Missouri State in 1992 and Harvard in 1998). They have made the NCAA Tournament in 1986, 1987, 1988, 1989, 1991, 1996, 2007, 2010, 2011, 2014, 2015, 2016, and 2023. They have made the WNIT in 2001, 2006, 2008, 2009, 2012, 2013, 2017, 2018, and 2019, finishing as runner-up in 2012.

Postseason results

NCAA Division I
The Dukes have appeared in the NCAA Division I Tournament twelve times. Their overall record in tournament games is 8–12.

WNIT
The Dukes have appeared in the Women's National Invitation Tournament (WNIT) nine times. They have an overall tournament record of 22-9. In the 2012 tournament, the Dukes finished as runners-up to Oklahoma State.

AIAW Division I
The Dukes, then the Madison College Dukes, made one appearance in the AIAW National Division I basketball tournament, with a combined record of 0–2.

References

External links